A rerun (or, sometimes, repeat) is a re-airing of an episode of a television program.

Rerun may also refer to:

Fictional characters
Rerun, a once-lived villain on the TV series Static Shock
Freddie "Rerun" Stubbs, a character in the American TV series What's Happening!!, portrayed by Fred Berry
Rerun van Pelt, a character in the Peanuts comic strip

Music
 "Re Run", a song by Man Overboard from the 2013 album Heart Attack
 "Rerun", a 2022 song by Mia Wray
 "Rerun", a song by Quavo from his 2018 album Quavo Huncho

Other uses
 Night of the Living Rerun, an original novel based on the Buffy the Vampire Slayer television series
 The Rerun Show, a short-lived sketch comedy that aired on NBC in 2002